Vitamin C is an essential nutrient, the compound L-ascorbic acid.

Vitamin C may also refer to:
Vitamin C (singer), an American pop music singer, dancer and actress
Vitamin C (album), her debut album
"Vitamin C" (song), a song by Can

See also
Chemistry of ascorbic acid
Vitamin C and the common cold
Vitamin C deficiency or scurvy
Vitamin C megadosage, high doses used in an attempt to obtain specific therapeutic effects 

sv:Vitamin C